Gulamur Rahman Maizbhandari (1865–1937), also known by his sobriquet Baba Bhandari, was a Bengali Sufi preacher who succeeded his uncle Syed Ahmad Ullah as the head of the Maizbhandari Sufi Order, the first such Sufi order in Bangladesh.

Background and ancestry
 
Gulamur Rahman's father was Abdul Karim Shah, Syed Ahmad Ullah’s youngest brother, and his mother was Musharaf Jaan. His paternal ancestors were Syeds and originally migrated from Madinah to Gaur, the erstwhile capital of medieval Bengal, via Baghdad and Delhi. His ancestor, Hamid ad-Din, was the appointed Imam and Qadi of Gaur, but due to a sudden epidemic in the city, Hamid later migrated to Patiya in Chittagong District. Hamid's son, and Syed Abdul Qadir, was made the imam of Azimnagar in modern-day Fatikchhari. He had two sons; Syed Ataullah and Syed Tayyab Ullah. The latter had three sons; Syed Ahmad, Syed Matiullah and Syed Abdul Karim, and the youngest son was the father of Syed Gulamur Rahman Baba Bhandari.

Early life and education 
He was born into a Bengali Muslim family in the village of Maizbhandar in Fatikchhari, Chittagong on 14 October 1865. His uncle, who called him “the rose of my garden”, entrusted him with the teaching of students, particularly adepts. He spent time wandering alone in the woods as part of his spiritual journey. Around 1914, he entered a state of meditation and stopped speaking except on rare occasions, thus becoming known as a magdub pir. In 1928, he moved out of his father's house into his own, where disciples and his four sons assumed responsibility for the order's administration.

Succession from Syed Ahmad Ullah 
According to German scholar Hans Harder,

See also
 List of Sufi Saints of South Asia
 Abdul-Qadir Gilani

References

External links
 

Indian Sufis
Indian religious leaders
Indian Sufi religious leaders
19th-century Muslim scholars of Islam
Hanafis
1826 births
1937 deaths
20th-century Bengalis
19th-century Bengalis
People from Fatikchhari Upazila
Bengali Muslim scholars of Islam